Platyptilia vilema is a moth of the family Pterophoridae. It is known from the Galápagos Islands.

The wingspan is 16–21 mm. Adults are on wing in March and April.

The larvae feed on Darwiniathamus species.

External links

vilema
Endemic fauna of the Galápagos Islands
Moths of South America
Moths described in 1993